Sivahyus was a genus of ground dwelling omnivorous even toed ungulates that existed in Asia during the Pliocene.

References

Miocene even-toed ungulates
Neogene mammals of Asia
Fossil taxa described in 1926
Pliocene even-toed ungulates
Prehistoric even-toed ungulate genera
Prehistoric Suidae
Hippohyini